The 2023 World Junior Alpine Skiing Championships will be held at St Anton am Arlberg Ski Resort in St Anton am Arlberg, Austria from 19 to 25 January 2023. For the first time, the Alpine combined will be held as a team event. It will be the forth time that a World Junior Alpine Skiing Championship is held in Austia after the editions in 1986, 1997 and 2007.

The races will take place on the Karl-Schranz-Ski course, which also hosted races of the 2001 Alpine Skiing World Championships.

Schedule
The competitive program is as follows (all times CET)

Medal summary

Men's events

Ladies events

Mixed events

Medal table

Participating nations

 
 
 
  (3)
  (16)
 
  (1)
 
  (12)
 
 
 
 
 
 
 
 
  (14)
  (11)
 
 
 
 
 
 
 
 
 
 
 
 
 
 
 
 
 
  (12)
 
 
 
 
 
 
 
 
 
 
  (16)
 
 
 
  (17)

References

External links

Results

World Junior Alpine Skiing Championships
World Junior Alpine Skiing Championships
2023 in Austrian sport
2023 in youth sport
International sports competitions hosted by Austria
January 2023 sports events in Austria